Sandhornøya or Sandhornøy is a mountainous island in the municipality of Gildeskål in Nordland county, Norway.  The  island is located south of the town of Bodø near the entrance to the Saltfjorden.  The mainland of Norway lies to the east and the islands of Fleina, Sørarnøya, and Nordarnøya lie to the west.  The villages of Lekanger, Mårnes, and Våg are located on the island.  The island is connected to the mainland by the Sandhornøy Bridge. Sandhornøy is also the birthplace of famous Norwegian professor and hymn writer, Elias Blix. A memorial monument of Blix can be seen by the coastline.

Salt festival
On August 29, 2014, the Salt festival was held on a western beach on Sandhornøya.  It included three architectural structures that were built on the beach and were inspired by the historic fish racks of Northern Norway.  The Finnish architect Sami Rintala designed them.  In one of the fish rack buildings, the Chinese artist Yang Fudong created a site specific outdoor film installation for the beach.

See also
 List of islands of Norway

References

Gildeskål
Islands of Nordland